Maciej Mizia (born 20 November 1965) is a retired Polish football midfielder.

References

1965 births
Living people
Polish footballers
Zagłębie Sosnowiec players
Ruch Chorzów players
Korona Kielce players
Zawisza Bydgoszcz players
Association football midfielders
Ekstraklasa players